Charles J. Vallone  (1901 – March 15, 1967) was an Italian-American judge. He served on the Queens County Civil Court.

Vallone was born in Italy. Robert F. Wagner, Jr., the Mayor of New York City, appointed Vallone to the Municipal Court in 1955. He lived in Astoria, Queens, and died in his chambers in Kew Gardens, Queens.

Vallone was the father of lawyer and politician Peter Vallone, Sr., and grandfather of lawyers and politicians Peter Vallone, Jr., and Paul Vallone.

The Judge Charles J. Vallone School is named after him.

His grandson Peter Vallone, Jr. is now a judge with the New York City Civil Court in Queens, the same role Charles had served in.

References

1901 births
1967 deaths
Vallone family
New York (state) state court judges
Italian emigrants to the United States
People from Astoria, Queens
20th-century American judges